Server may refer to:

Computing
Server (computing), a computer program or a device that provides functionality for other programs or devices, called clients

Role
 Waiting staff, those who work at a restaurant or a bar attending customers and supplying them with food and drink as requested
 Server, a tennis player who makes a serve; see Serve (tennis)
 Altar server, a lay assistant to a member of the clergy during a Christian liturgy.

Other uses
 Server (name)
 Server Sundaram, a 1964 Indian comedy film
 Server, any serving utensil; see List of serving utensils

See also
 Serve (disambiguation)
 Service (disambiguation)
 Cake and pie server